Hashem Yekezareh is an Iranian engineer and industrial executive. Previously a senior executive for SAIPA, he serves as the Chairman of the Managing Board of Iran Khodro, Iran's largest car manufacturer since 2013. He was also chairman of Saipa Diesel (12 years), Pars Khodro (7 years) and Iran Khodro Diesel (4 years).

References

Amirkabir University of Technology alumni
Iranian businesspeople
Iranian engineers
Iranian industrial engineers
Living people
Year of birth missing (living people)